Silvio José del Rosario Parodi Rojas (30 August 1932 – 22 August 2006) was a football player and coach from Paraguay.

Parodi was born in Luque. He played for Sportivo Luqueño, Calcio Padova, Genoa, UD Las Palmas, Nîmes Olympique and FC Mulhouse. After retiring from football as a player he became a coach and his first managerial job was for the French side FC Mulhouse.
 
He died in August 2006 and was buried in his native town of Luque.

External links and references

 La Liga profile
 

1932 births
2006 deaths
Sportspeople from Luque
Paraguayan footballers
Association football midfielders
Paraguay international footballers
1958 FIFA World Cup players
Serie A players
La Liga players
Ligue 1 players
Sportivo Luqueño players
Calcio Padova players
Genoa C.F.C. players
UD Las Palmas players
Segunda División players
Nîmes Olympique players
FC Mulhouse players
Paraguayan football managers
Paraguayan expatriate footballers
Paraguayan expatriate sportspeople in Italy
Expatriate footballers in Italy
Paraguayan expatriate sportspeople in Spain
Expatriate footballers in Spain
Paraguayan expatriate sportspeople in France
Expatriate footballers in France